BBC Radio Kent is the BBC's local radio station serving the county of Kent.

It broadcasts on FM, DAB, digital TV and via BBC Sounds from studios at The Great Hall in Tunbridge Wells.

According to RAJAR, the station has a weekly audience of 175,000 listeners and a 2.3% share as of December 2022.

History
The radio station was launched in 1970 under the name of BBC Radio Medway, originally only serving the Medway Towns. It broadcast from studios at 30 High Street in Rochester, a former newspaper office which was subsequently named Media House.  The local radio station became well known in the early 1980s for its early Friday evening soul music show presented by DJ Dave Brown, becoming one of the most listened to soul shows in the UK before DJ Robbie Vincent earned that achievement with the national broadcaster BBC Radio 1 in 1983.

The station gained its current name on 2 July 1983 when operations expanded to cover all of Kent as part of the BBC's policy of operating countywide stations. Radio Medway was closed down by long serving staff member Rod Lucas, who was also the first voice to be heard on the new BBC Radio Kent.

In July 1986, the studios moved to the nearby Sun Pier, from where it broadcast in stereo for the first time.

On 18 March 1994, BBC Radio Kent stopped broadcasting on 1035 kHz MW due to the frequency being reallocated to a new London-wide commercial radio station.

In 2001, the station moved to The Great Hall in Royal Tunbridge Wells, to combine with new television studios for the BBC South East region covering Kent and Sussex. From here BBC Radio Kent operates a total of five studios – two for programmes, one for news bulletins, one network contributions area, and a comprehensive live performance area. Since gaining the live performance area, live music has played an increasingly important part of the station's output. The music studio is in use daily as part of the evening arts strand "The Dominic King Show". 

In 2015, under the direction of a new Station Managing Editor, the station created a comprehensive Station Imaging Creative Department. Organised more along the lines of a commercial stations Creative Department, it is responsible for trails, idents and jingles. The three person department also undertook creative imaging for shared programmes originating from Tunbridge Wells, as well as providing trails for other stations in the South East cluster. Other Local BBC Radio usually has a single Station Sound producer, not a whole department. 

BBC Radio Kent also operated a studio and office in The Wendy House (a building close to the original Sun Pier site in Chatham), although this has since closed, and small contributions studios in Dover and Canterbury.

Programming
Local programming airs from the BBC's Tunbridge studios from 6am to 10pm on weekdays, from 6am – 6pm and 8-10pm on Saturdays and from 6am – 6pm on Sundays.

Off-peak programming, including the weekday late show from 10pm – 1am, originates from BBC Radio Solent in Southampton and BBC Essex in Chelmsford.

During the station's downtime, BBC Radio Kent simulcasts overnight programming from BBC Radio 5 Live and BBC Radio London.

Notable former presenters

 Jimmy Mack (1970–1983)
 Don Durbridge (1983–1992)
 Mo Dutta (1991–1994)
 Barbara Sturgeon (1983–2004)
 Dave Cash (1999–2016)
 Alex Lester (2017)
 Richard Spendlove (1989–2017)

References

External links
 BBC Radio Kent
 BBC Kent local homepage
 Media UK – BBC Radio Kent

Radio stations established in 1970
Kent
Radio stations in Kent
Borough of Tunbridge Wells
1970 establishments in England